The 1915 Carmarthen Boroughs by-election was held on 17 March 1915.  The by-election was held due to the incumbent Liberal MP, W. Llewelyn Williams, becoming Recorder of Cardiff.  It was retained by Williams who was unopposed due to a War-time electoral pact.

References

1915 elections in the United Kingdom
1915 in Wales
1910s elections in Wales
20th century in Carmarthenshire
March 1915 events
Carmarthen
Elections in Carmarthenshire
By-elections to the Parliament of the United Kingdom in Welsh constituencies
Unopposed ministerial by-elections to the Parliament of the United Kingdom (need citation)